Acronia pretiosa is a species of beetle in the family Cerambycidae found in Asia. It is endemic to the Philippines.

References

Acronia
Beetles described in 1917